LOONY is the stage name of Kira Huszar, a Canadian rhythm and blues singer from Scarborough, Ontario. She is most noted for her 2021 EP soft thing, which was longlisted for the 2022 Polaris Music Prize.

She was previously a SOCAN Songwriting Prize nominee in 2020 for her single "Some Kinda Love".

In 2023, she participated in an all-star recording of Serena Ryder's single "What I Wouldn't Do", which was released as a charity single to benefit Kids Help Phone's Feel Out Loud campaign for youth mental health.

Discography
Part 1 (2018)
JOYRiDE (2020)
soft thing (2021)

References

21st-century Canadian women singers
Canadian rhythm and blues singers
Musicians from Toronto
Living people
Year of birth missing (living people)